Lino Gallardo (1773–1837) was a Venezuelan composer, conductor, and string player, and was among the musicians who participated in and contributed to the Wars of Independence.

References 
Lino Gallardo - Venezuelatuya.com
Venezuela Symphony orchestra Magazine, 25th anniversary, 1955.

1773 births
1837 deaths
Venezuelan classical musicians
Venezuelan composers
Male composers
People from Ocumare del Tuy